Antonio de Guarás (1520–1579), was a Spanish merchant who was the ambassador of Philip II of Spain to Elizabeth I of England between 1571 and 1578.

References

1520 births
1579 deaths
Ambassadors of Spain to England
Spanish merchants
16th-century Spanish businesspeople